Walton Wait House was a historic home located at Parkersburg, Wood County, West Virginia. It was built between about 1860 and 1870, and is a two-story, frame house in a transitional Greek Revival / Italianate style.  It has a gable roof with an intersecting side gable. It was moved to its present location about 1924, with the former front facade now oriented to the rear.

It was listed on the National Register of Historic Places in 1982.

References

Houses in Parkersburg, West Virginia
Houses on the National Register of Historic Places in West Virginia
Greek Revival houses in West Virginia
Italianate architecture in West Virginia
National Register of Historic Places in Wood County, West Virginia